The 1990 Arizona Classic was a women's  tennis tournament played on outdoor hard courts at the Scottsdale Princess in Scottsdale, Arizona in the United States and was part of Tier IV of the 1990 WTA Tour. It was the fifth edition of the tournament and was held from October 15 through October 21, 1990. First-seeded Conchita Martínez won the singles title and earned $27,000 first-prize money.

Finals

Singles
 Conchita Martínez defeated  Marianne Werdel 7–5, 6–1
 It was Martínez' 2nd singles of the year and the 6th of her career.

Doubles
 Elise Burgin /  Helen Kelesi defeated  Sandy Collins /  Ronni Reis 6–4, 6–2

References

External links
 ITF tournament edition details
 Tournament draws

Virginia Slims of Arizona
Virginia Slims of Arizona
Arizona Classic
Arizona Classic